Mikkel Warming (born May 15, 1969) has been the mayor of the Social Affairs Committee in Copenhagen since 2005, and has been a member of the city council since 1994. He was a member of the Socialist People's Party until 1996, when he changed to the Red-Green Alliance.

References

1969 births
Living people
Socialist People's Party (Denmark) politicians
Politicians from Copenhagen

20th-century Copenhagen City Council members
21st-century Copenhagen City Council members